Asmalı can refer to:

 Asmalı, Çan
 Asmalı, Gölhisar
 Asmalı Konak
 Asmalı, Yumurtalık